Cochlostyla smaragdina is a species of small, air-breathing land snails, terrestrial pulmonate gastropod mollusks, in the family Camaenidae endemic to the Philippines. The specific name "smaragdina" comes from "smaragdus," Latin for "emerald," and refers to the brilliant green of mature specimens. This name is commonly misspelled as "smargadina," an error which has propagated through multiple databases.

References

Taxa named by Lovell Augustus Reeve
Gastropods described in 1842
Taxonomy articles created by Polbot
Taxobox binomials not recognized by IUCN